The battlecruiser was the brainchild of Admiral Sir John ("Jacky") Fisher, the man who had sponsored the construction of the world's first "all big gun" warship, . He visualised a new breed of warship with the armament of a battleship, but faster, lighter, and less heavily armoured.

This design philosophy was most successful in action when the battlecruisers could use their speed to run down smaller and weaker ships. The best example is the Battle of the Falkland Islands where  and  sank the German armoured cruisers  and  almost without damage to themselves, despite numerous hits by the German ships. They were less successful against heavily armoured ships, as was demonstrated by the loss of Invincible, and  during the Battle of Jutland in 1916. All three ships were destroyed by more heavily armoured German battlecruisers, with the British failure to prevent fires or explosions in the gun turrets from reaching the magazines also playing a role in the losses.

The Renown and Courageous classes, built during the war, were begun when Admiral Fisher was appointed First Sea Lord for the second time in late 1914. Each of these classes in turn served as the fastest capital ships in the world and were heavily armed with four or six  guns, but they paid for their speed and armament by having less armour than battleships.  was laid down during the war, but was extensively reworked with more armour based on the experience gained at the Battle of Jutland, and was not completed until after the war.

Following the war, the British planned to build the G3 class, which had the same armament and armour as battleships of the time and were rated as battlecruisers only by comparison to the more heavily armoured and slower battleships also planned. They were cancelled as they exceeded the tonnage limits of the Washington Naval Treaty. Of the first nine battlecruisers, only HMS Tiger survived the Washington Treaty and into the 1930s. The three Courageous-class ships were converted to aircraft carriers during the 1920s and only Repulse, Renown and Hood served in the Second World War as battlecruisers. All three went through substantial refits between the wars. Hood was lost in the battle of the Denmark Strait, Repulse was sunk by Japanese aircraft at the start of the war in the Pacific, and Renown survived the war to be scrapped in 1948.

Key

Invincible class

The Invincible-class ships were the first battlecruisers in the world. The design resembled that of HMS Dreadnought, but sacrificed armour protection and one gun turret from the main battery for a  speed advantage. During the war Inflexible and Indomitable participated in the unsuccessful pursuit of the German ships Goeben and Breslau in the Mediterranean. Inflexible was recalled home shortly afterwards, but Indomitable remained off the Dardanelles to bottle up the German ships for the rest of 1914 before returning to the UK. Invincible and Inflexible were sent to the South Atlantic in late 1914 to hunt down the German East Asia Squadron and destroyed it at the Battle of the Falkland Islands. Indomitable participated in the Battle of Dogger Bank in the North Sea in early 1915 while Inflexible was badly damaged during the opening stages of the Dardanelles Campaign. The ships formed the 3rd Battlecruiser Squadron at Jutland where Invincible was destroyed by the explosion of an artillery magazine. The two surviving ships spent the rest of the war conducting patrols of the North Sea, as the High Seas Fleet was forbidden by the Kaiser to risk any more losses. They were put into reserve in early 1919 and sold for scrap on 1 December 1921.

Indefatigable class

The design of the Indefatigable class represented a modest reworking of the preceding s, featuring increased endurance and an improved cross-deck arc of fire for their midships wing turrets achieved by lengthening the hull. Like its predecessor, the design resembled the contemporary dreadnought, but sacrificed armour protection and one turret from the main battery for a 4-knot speed advantage. New Zealand agreed to fund one battlecruiser and chose a modified Indefatigable design rather than the  then being built for the Royal Navy.

They spent most of the war patrolling the North Sea and participated in most of the battles there. 
Of the two, only New Zealand was in the United Kingdom when the war began. New Zealand participated in some of the early actions in the North Sea, including the Battle of Heligoland Bight and the inconclusive Scarborough Raid. Indefatigable and New Zealand participated in the Battle of Jutland, where the former was destroyed by a magazine explosion after numerous hits from the battlecruiser . New Zealand patrolled uneventfully after Jutland, watching for the next appearance of the High Seas Fleet. She conducted Admiral Jellicoe on his tour of India and the Dominions after the war. New Zealand was sold for scrap in 1922 to comply with the Washington Naval Treaty.

Lion class

HMS Lion served as the flagship of the Grand Fleet's battlecruisers throughout the First World War, except when she was being refitted or under repair. She sank the German light cruiser  during the Battle of Heligoland Bight and served as Vice Admiral Beatty's flagship at the battles of Dogger Bank and Jutland. During the Battle of Jutland she suffered a serious propellant fire that destroyed one gun turret, which had to be removed and rebuilt while the ship was under repair for several months.

Princess Royal served in the Battle of Heligoland Bight a month after the war began and then was sent to the Caribbean to prevent the German East Asia Squadron from using the Panama Canal. After the East Asia Squadron was sunk at the Battle of the Falkland Islands by the two Invincible-class battlecruisers, Princess Royal rejoined the 1st Battlecruiser Squadron. During the Battle of Dogger Bank she scored only a few hits, although one directly crippled the German armoured cruiser , which allowed the enemy vessel to be caught and sunk by the concentrated fire of the British battlecruisers. Shortly afterwards Princess Royal became the flagship of the 1st Battlecruiser Squadron, under the command of Rear Admiral Osmond Brock. She was moderately damaged during the Battle of Jutland and required a month and a half of repairs. Both ships spent the rest of the war on uneventful patrols in the North Sea, although they did provide distant cover during the Second Battle of Heligoland Bight in 1917. In 1920 they were both put into reserve and were sold for scrap a few years later under the terms of the Washington Naval Treaty.

HMS Queen Mary

HMS Queen Mary was similar to the s, though she was slightly larger and given more powerful engines to achieve the same speed as the earlier ships. Her secondary guns were better protected and some of her belt armour was redistributed. She was the last battlecruiser completed before the beginning of the war, and she participated in the Battle of Heligoland Bight shortly after the war began. As part of the 1st Battlecruiser Squadron, she unsuccessfully attempted to intercept a German force that bombarded the North Sea coast of England in December 1914. She was refitting during the Battle of Dogger Bank in early 1915, but participated in the next major fleet action of the war, the Battle of Jutland in mid-1916. Queen Mary hit the German battlecruiser  early in the battle and burnt out one of that ship's rear turrets. Seydlitz later knocked out one of Queen Marys main guns. The German battlecruiser , in the meantime, had lost sight of her previous target in the haze and switched to Queen Mary. Within 10 minutes, Queen Mary was hit twice, exploding  shortly afterwards.

HMS Tiger

HMS Tiger was the most heavily armoured battlecruiser of the Royal Navy at the start of the First World War, although she was still being finished when the war began. The ship was assigned to the 1st Battlecruiser Squadron for the duration of the war and participated in the Battle of Dogger Bank in early 1915 even though she was still shaking down and did not perform well. She next participated in the Battle of Jutland in 1916 where she was one of the British battlecruisers most often hit by German shells; she was only lightly damaged. She spent the rest of the war on uneventful patrols in the North Sea, although she did provide distant cover during the Second Battle of Heligoland Bight.

Tiger was the oldest battlecruiser retained by the Royal Navy after the tonnage limits of the Washington Naval Treaty came into effect in 1922. She became a gunnery training ship in 1924 and joined the Battlecruiser Squadron in 1929 while its flagship, underwent a lengthy refit. Upon Hoods return to service in 1931, Tiger was decommissioned and sold for scrap in 1932 in accordance with the terms of the London Naval Treaty of 1930.

Renown class

The Renown-class ships were originally laid down as improved versions of the s. Construction was suspended at the outbreak of the war on the grounds they would not be ready in time. Admiral Lord Fisher, upon becoming First Sea Lord, gained approval to restart their construction as battlecruisers that could be built and enter service quickly. The Director of Naval Construction (DNC), Eustace Tennyson-D'Eyncourt, quickly produced an entirely new design to meet Admiral Lord Fisher's requirements and the builders agreed to deliver the ships in 15 months. They did not quite meet that ambitious goal, but they were delivered a few months after the Battle of Jutland in 1916. They were the world's fastest capital ships upon completion.

 was the only ship of the class to see combat in the First World War when she participated in the Second Battle of Heligoland Bight in 1917. Repulse was sunk on 10 December 1941 in the South China Sea off Kuantan, Pahang, by Japanese aircraft.

Renown spent much of 1940 and 1941 assigned to Force H at Gibraltar escorting convoys, and she fought in the inconclusive Battle of Cape Spartivento. She was briefly assigned to the Home Fleet and provided cover to several Arctic convoys in early 1942. The ship was transferred back to Force H for Operation Torch and spent much of 1943 refitting and transporting Winston Churchill and his staff to and from various conferences with Allied leaders. In early 1944 Renown was transferred to the Eastern Fleet in the Indian Ocean, where she supported numerous attacks on Japanese-occupied facilities in Indonesia and various island groups in the Indian Ocean. The ship returned to the Home Fleet in early 1945 and was placed in reserve after the end of the war. Renown was sold for scrap in 1948.

Courageous class

The Courageous class comprised three battlecruisers, known as "large light cruisers", that were nominally designed to support Admiral of the Fleet Lord John Fisher's Baltic Project, which was intended to land troops on the German Baltic Coast. The ships of this class were fast but very lightly armoured with only a few heavy guns. They were given a shallow draught, in part to allow them to operate in the shallow waters of the Baltic but also reflecting experience gained earlier in the war. To maximize their speed, the Courageous class were the first capital ships of the Royal Navy to use geared steam turbines and small-tube boilers. This made them the fastest capital ships in existence, slightly faster than even the Renown-class ships.

They participated in the Second Battle of Heligoland Bight and were present when the High Seas Fleet surrendered a year later. Their half-sister  was designed with a pair of  guns, the largest guns ever fitted on a ship of the Royal Navy, but was modified during construction to take a flying-off deck and hangar in lieu of her forward turret and barbette. After some patrols in the North Sea her rear turret was removed and another flight deck added. Her aircraft attacked the Zeppelin sheds during the Tondern raid in July 1918. All three ships were laid up after the end of the war, but were rebuilt as aircraft carriers during the 1920s. Glorious and Courageous were sunk early in the Second World War and Furious was sold for scrap in 1948.

Admiral class

The Admiral-class battlecruisers were intended as improved versions of the s, but were recast as battlecruisers after Admiral John Jellicoe, commander of the Grand Fleet, saw no real need for more battleships. A number of German battlecruisers had been laid down that were superior to the bulk of the Grand Fleet's battlecruisers so the design was revised to counter these. Their designs were updated to incorporate the lessons from the Battle of Jutland, but the Admiralty eventually decided that it was better to begin again with a clean-slate design so they were cancelled in 1919.

Hood, however, was sufficiently advanced in construction that she was completed in 1920 and immediately became flagship of the Battlecruiser Squadron of the Atlantic Fleet. On 23 April 1937, after the beginning of the Spanish Civil War, she escorted three British merchantmen into Bilbao harbour despite the presence of the Nationalist cruiser  that attempted to blockade the port. Hood spent most of the early part of the Second World War patrolling against German commerce raiders and escorting convoys. As flagship of Force H based at Gibraltar, she bombarded French ships during the attack on Mers-el-Kébir. In the subsequent Battle of the Denmark Strait Hoods aft magazines exploded, sinking her within five minutes of the start of the battle.

G3 battlecruiser

The G3 battlecruisers were planned as a response to naval expansion programmes by the United States and Japan. The four ships of this class would have been larger, faster, and more heavily armed than any existing battleship (although several projected foreign ships would be larger). The "battlecruiser" designation came from their higher speed and lesser firepower and armour relative to the planned N3-class battleship design. The G3s would have carried nine  guns and were expected to achieve , while the N3s would carry nine  guns on the same displacement at the expense of a slower speed. While officially referred to as "battlecruisers", the G3s have also been considered "fast battleships".

The G3 design was approved by the Board of Admiralty on 12 August 1921. Orders were placed in October and November, but were suspended later in November with the beginning of the Washington Naval Conference, which limited battleship numbers. The orders were cancelled in February 1922 with the ratification of the Washington Naval Treaty, which limited construction to ships of no more than  displacement.

Notes

Footnotes

References

 
 
 
 
 

 
 
 

 
Battlecruisers
Royal Navy
Royal Navy